Guided By Fire is the first studio album of the Finnish doom metal band Ghost Brigade. It features Aleksi Munter of Swallow the Sun fame providing guest keyboards and Fredrik Nordin of the band Dozer providing backing vocals.

Track listing

Personnel

Band members 
 Manne Ikonen – lead vocals
 Tommi Kiviniemi – guitar
 Wille Naukkarinen – guitar
 Veli-Matti Suihkonen – drums, percussion
 Janne Julin – bass

Guests 
 Aleksi Munter (Swallow the Sun) – keyboard
 Fredrik Nordin (Dozer) – guest vocals

Production 
 Mikko Poikolainen - production, mastering, mixing, engineering
 Aaro Seppovaara - mixing, mastering
 Tommi Kiviniemi - photography
 Benjamin Farwicker - photography
 Hollowman - cover art

References 

2007 debut albums
Ghost Brigade (band) albums
Season of Mist albums